Alan Fisher (20 June 1922 – 20 March 1988) was a British trade unionist.

Born in Birmingham, Fisher spent his entire working life at the National Union of Public Employees, serving as General Secretary from 1968 to 1982.  This was a period of rapid growth for the union and included the Winter of Discontent.  In 1981, he served as President of the Trades Union Congress.

References

External links
Catalogue of Fisher's papers, held at the Modern Records Centre, University of Warwick

1922 births
1988 deaths
General Secretaries of the National Union of Public Employees
People from Birmingham, West Midlands
Presidents of the Trades Union Congress